Polypedates taeniatus is a species of frog in the family Rhacophoridae. It is found in the Bengal region of Bangladesh and India as well as in Assam and southern Nepal. It is also known as the Bengal whipping frog, Bengal whipping tree frog, and Terai tree frog.

It is an arboreal species. The eggs are deposited in branches overhanging small pools. Upon hatching, the tadpoles drop into the pools. It is generally a common species, but habitat loss through deforestation is a threat to it. It is reported from the Orang National Park in India.

References

taeniatus
Frogs of Bangladesh
Frogs of India
Amphibians of Nepal
Taxa named by George Albert Boulenger
Amphibians described in 1906
Taxonomy articles created by Polbot